The Canneries is a Canadian documentary film, directed by Stephen Insley and Bonni Devlin and released in 1987. The film presents a history of salmon canneries in British Columbia.

The film received a Genie Award nomination for Best Feature Length Documentary at the 9th Genie Awards in 1988.

References

External links
 

1987 films
1987 documentary films
Canadian documentary films
Films shot in British Columbia
1980s English-language films
1980s Canadian films